Kielder a village in Northumberland, England.

Kielder may also refer to a number of locations in Northumberland, England, UK: 

 Kielder railway station, in the village
 Kielder Water, a reservoir
 Kielder Viaduct, a rail viaduct over Kielder Water
 Kielder Forest, a tree plantation around Kielder village and Kielder Water
 Kielder Observatory, an astronomical observatory in Kielder Forest

See also